Ferdi Sabit Soyer (born March 5, 1952) is a former Prime Minister of the Turkish Republic of Northern Cyprus, and former Leader of Republican Turkish Party (CTP).

Soyer, a former union leader, has been a member of the TRNC parliament since 1985 (except for a three-year absence between 1990 and 1993). He was named successor to Talat's former post of TRNC Prime Minister on April 25, 2005.

Soyer was born in Nicosia in 1952, attending secondary school in Cyprus, then continued towards a degree in medicine from Turkey. However, due to political reasons he did not complete his university education. While there, Soyer co-founded the Youth Federation of Turkish Cypriot Students (KOGEF) and he was also its leader for a time.

Upon returning to Cyprus, Soyer continued to take an active part in various Turkish-Cypriot political movements. He worked as a member of Republican Turkish Party for a long time, recently holding the party office of secretary-general.

TRNC Cabinet offices that Soyer held was Minister of Agriculture, Natural Resources and Energy in the 1993 DP-CTP coalition government.

Soyer was elected as the new Chairman of the Republican Turkish Party on 21 May 2005, replacing President Talat who vacated his position after taking over the presidency.

Soyer is married with two children.

References 

1952 births
Living people
21st-century prime ministers of Northern Cyprus
People from Nicosia
Republican Turkish Party politicians
Prime Ministers of Northern Cyprus
Members of the Assembly of the Republic (Northern Cyprus)
Turkish Cypriot expatriates in Turkey